Chungnam Ilhwa Chunma WFC was a South Korean women's football team based in Chungnam. They played in the WK League between 2009 and 2012.

Records

Year-by-year

References

Sport in South Chungcheong Province
Cheonan
W
WK League clubs
Women's football clubs in South Korea
Association football clubs established in 2006
Association football clubs disestablished in 2012
Unification Church affiliated organizations
2006 establishments in South Korea
2012 disestablishments in South Korea